Violet Ranney "Bunny" Lang (married name Phillips, 11 May 1924 – 29 July 1956) was an American poet and playwright.

Biography
Born into a wealthy Boston family, Violet R. Lang was a debutante who began college at the University of Chicago but dropped out to join the Canadian Women's Army Corps in World War II. After the war, she was an editor for the Chicago Review (founded in 1946) and published some of her work in Chicago's Poetry: A Magazine of Verse. By 1950, Lang had returned to Cambridge, Massachusetts, where she became a friend of Frank O'Hara. At the Poets' Theatre she appeared, with John Ashbery, in the first production of O'Hara's play Try! Try! (1951). Among the poets of the New York School, she was a close friend to Frank O'Hara, John Ashberry, and Kenneth Koch. For a brief time in 1951 she was a burlesque dancer in Boston. She picked up Gregory Corso on the streets of New York City and persuaded her friends in Cambridge to help him live on a dorm room floor in Harvard's Eliot House. Her play I Too Have Lived in Arcadia (1954) is based upon her love affair with the painter Michael Goldberg.

Her father was Malcolm Burrage Lang (1881–1972), a 1902 Harvard graduate who was an organist and director of music at King's Chapel, Boston. Her mother was Ethel Ranney Lang, whose father Fletcher Ranney was a Boston lawyer. Violet R. Lang was the youngest of the six children (all daughters) of Malcolm and Ethel Lang, who raised their family at 209 Bay State Road. In April 1955 at Christ Church, Cambridge, Massachusetts, Violet R. Lang married Bradley Sawyer Phillips (1929–1991). She died of Hodgkin's disease at age 32. Frank O'Hara wrote a series of poems from 1956 to 1959 in mourning her death.

References

External links

1924 births
1956 deaths
20th-century American poets
20th-century American women writers
American women poets
American women dramatists and playwrights
Writers from Boston
University of Chicago alumni